Laura Fitton  is the founder of Twitter app store, oneforty and the co-Author of Twitter for Dummies.

Career
Fitton is the founder of the Twitter app store oneforty which was acquired by HubSpot in August 2011.

In 2010 she was listed in Fast Company as one of the Most Influential Women in Technology, and by Huffington Post as a Female Founder to Watch in Twitter.

In 2011 she received PepsiCo's  Women's Inspiration Network award, MassHighTech designated her a Woman to Watch  and she received a Women Entrepreneurs in Science & Technology (WEST) Leadership Award.  She also appeared on Mashable's 44 Female Founders Every Entrepreneur Should Know list in 2012.

Fitton is the co-Author of the book Twitter for Dummies.

References

External links
 Article on Laura Fitton at Mashable
 Article on Laura Fitton at Forbes
 Laura Fitton interviewed on The Social Hour

Living people
Cornell University alumni
American women in business
1972 births
21st-century American businesspeople
21st-century American women